The Ak-Sar-Ben Bridge was a Whipple through truss bridge that was the first road bridge to cross the Missouri River connecting Omaha, Nebraska and Council Bluffs, Iowa.  It was replaced in 1966 by the Interstate 480 girder bridge.

History 
Originally called the Douglas Street Bridge, the bridge was built by the Omaha and Council Bluffs Street Railway Company in 1888 at a cost of $500,000. It was designed to handle streetcars and replaced a ferry service that had opened in 1854. It was originally built as a single bridge. Due to increased demand, they built a twin sister bridge next to the existing one. It was the Lincoln Highway bridge from 1913 to 1930. (Notice the L for Lincoln Highway in the picture.) It was then the Highway 30 bridge, then Highway 30A, then Highway 30 S until its destruction.

Tolls 
It was a toll bridge. As automobiles became more popular, there were resentments about the tolls. In 1895, a group of businessmen formed the "Knights of Ak-Sar-Ben" ("Nebraska" spelled backward).  In 1938, they sold bonds to finance the purchase of the bridge for $2,350,000.  They continued to charge tolls until 1947, at which point the bonds were paid off and the structure, along with the South Omaha Bridge, became free bridges.  The hated toll booths were paraded through Omaha before a crowd of 35,000 observers to celebrate Free Bridge Day on September 24, 1947.  The estimated traffic on the bridge doubled the following year.

Replacement and removal 
It was replaced in November 1966 with an unnamed I-480 girder bridge (I-480 was to go on and be named the "Gerald R. Ford Freeway" after the native son President).  Attempts were made to salvage the bridge as a pedestrian walkway, but it was demolished in 1968 although the east pier remains in the river just south of the interstate on the Council Bluffs side.

U.S. Route 6 overlaps the interstate to cross the river.

See also
List of crossings of the Missouri River

References

External links
"Douglas Street Bridge", Omaha Public Library.

Bridges in Omaha, Nebraska
Road bridges in Nebraska
Buildings and structures in Council Bluffs, Iowa
Bridges over the Missouri River
Bridges completed in 1888
Demolished buildings and structures in Omaha, Nebraska
Demolished bridges in the United States
Bridges in Pottawattamie County, Iowa
Road bridges in Iowa
Former toll bridges in Iowa
Former toll bridges in Nebraska
Omaha Ak-Sar-Ben Knights
Buildings and structures demolished in 1968
Interstate vehicle bridges in the United States
1888 establishments in Iowa
1888 establishments in Nebraska
1968 disestablishments in Iowa
1968 disestablishments in Nebraska